Donald Byrd and 125th Street, N.Y.C. is an album by trumpeter Donald Byrd released on the Elektra label in 1979.

Track listing
All compositions by Donald Byrd except where noted 
 "Pretty Baby" (Donald Byrd, Ronnie Garrett, William Duckett) – 5:05
 "Gold the Moon, White the Sun" (Byrd, Kathy Wakefield) – 5:27
 "Giving It Up" – 5:06
 "Marilyn" – 3:58
 "People Suppose to Be Free" (Byrd, Wakefield) – 4:48
 "Veronica" – 4:23
 "Morning" (Clare Fischer) – 4:05
 "I Love You" – 4:04

Personnel
Donald Byrd – trumpet, flugelhorn, arranger
Clare Fischer – Organ/Yamaha EX-42 ARP Pro Soloist, Fender Rhodes, Dyno-My-Piano, alto saxophone, acoustic piano
Ronnie Garrett – electric bass
William "Country" Duckett – electric guitar
Pete Christlieb – saxophone
Ernie Watts – flute
Victor (Butch) Azevedo – drums, – percussion
Jim Gilstrap, John Lehman, Joyce Michael, Michael Campbell, Mitch Gordon, Zedric Turnbough – vocals

References

Elektra Records albums
Donald Byrd albums
1979 albums